José Manuel Rodríguez Uribes (born 9 October 1968) is a Spanish philosopher of law and politician of the Spanish Socialist Workers' Party (PSOE) who has been serving as Minister of Culture and Sport in the government of Prime Minister Pedro Sánchez since 2020. He is also a member of the PSOE's federal executive board.

Rodríguez Uribes was a member of the Assembly of Madrid from 2019 to 2020. He served as Government Delegate in the Community of Madrid between 2018 and 2019.

Early life and education 
Born in Valencia on 9 October 1968, Rodríguez Uribes earned a licentiate degree in law at the University of Valencia (UV); he later obtained a PhD in the same field at the Charles III University of Madrid (UC3M), reading a dissertation in 1998 titled Los discursos democrático y liberal sobre la opinión pública (dos modelos, Rousseau y Constant) and supervised by Gregorio Peces Barba.

Early career 
Rodríguez Uribes was appointed Director General in Support of the Victims of Terrorism in September 2006. He held the post until December 2011, when Mariano Rajoy became Prime Minister.

Rodríguez Uribes has worked as tenured professor both at the UV and the UC3M.

Political career 
Rodríguez Uribes joined the Federal Executive Board of the Spanish Socialist Workers' Party (PSOE) led by Pedro Sánchez in June 2017, tasked in the area of Laicity.

Following the investiture of Sánchez as Prime Minister in June 2018, Rodríguez Uribes was chosen to replace Concepción Dancausa at the helm of the Government Delegation in the Community of Madrid. His appointment was sanctioned through an 18 June royal decree, swearing in the post on 25 June.

Rodríguez Uribes remained in office until April 2019 as he was included then in the 3rd place of the PSOE list for the 2019 Madrilenian regional election led by Ángel Gabilondo.

As an elected member of the 11th term of the regional legislature, Rodríguez Uribes became the attached spokesperson of the Socialist Parliamentary Group.

Minister of Culture and Sport, 2020–present 
Appointed Minister of Culture and Sport of the Sánchez II Government, Rodríguez Uribes assumed office on 13 January 2020.

Amid the COVID-19 pandemic in Spain, Rodríguez Uribes led efforts to re-open the country's public life by announcing in May 2021 that a maximum of 5,000 spectators would be able to attend soccer games in regions with fewer than 50 COVID-19 cases per 100,000 inhabitants.

Works

References 
Citations

Bibliography
 
 

Members of the 11th Assembly of Madrid
Philosophers of law
1968 births
Charles III University of Madrid alumni
University of Valencia alumni
Living people